SERVO-ROBOT Group is a company that develops and creates intelligent sensing and digital vision systems to simplify manufacturing process automation such as welding. Therefore, the main activity is to build intelligent sensing systems based on precision measurement with laser beams and other intelligent sensing devices applicable to various industries such as automotive, railroad, pipe and tube, aerospace, shipbuilding, fabricated structures, windmill towers manufacturing, etc.

Founded in 1983, SERVO-ROBOT has established its world headquarters, production plant and research and development center in the St-Bruno Industrial Park, south of Montreal, Quebec, Canada. More than 95% of SERVO-ROBOT's products are exported outside of Canada every year.

Applications 

Innovations developed in patents mentioned in the above section resulted in concrete solutions easily applicable to markets ranging from automotive to aerospace which has helped many companies  and factories to become more productive and reach their Six Sigma constant improvements goals.

Notes

References 
 SERVO-ROBOT Group general web site

External links 
Robotic Industry Association 
Manufacturing Talk 

Manufacturing companies of Canada